The November 2022 United States House of Representatives election in Alaska was held on Tuesday November 8, to elect a member of the United States House of Representatives to represent the state of Alaska. Democratic incumbent Mary Peltola won reelection to a full term in office, defeating Republicans Sarah Palin and Nick Begich III and Libertarian Chris Bye in the runoff count.

Following voter approval of Ballot Measure 2 during the 2020 elections in Alaska, this was the second U.S. House election in Alaska held under the new election process, after the special election for the same seat on August 16, 2022, where Peltola was elected to succeed Republican Don Young, who died on March 18, 2022. All candidates ran in a nonpartisan blanket top-four primary on the same day as the special election, with each voter casting a single vote for their preferred candidate. The four candidates who received the most votes were eventual incumbent Mary Peltola, Sarah Palin, Nick Begich III, and Tara Sweeney. However, Sweeney withdrew from the race, so fifth-place finisher Chris Bye moved on to the general election in her place.  

In the general election, Peltola led the first round by over twenty percentage points, but since no candidate received a majority of the votes in the first round, the instant runoff was triggered. Though Palin received an overwhelming majority of second-choice votes from Begich voters, it was not enough to catch Peltola, who won the final round by ten percentage points. 

Peltola's final-round vote share of 55% was the best performance for a statewide Democratic candidate in Alaska since the 1974 Senate race and the best performance for any statewide candidate in the state since the 2012 House race. Peltola was one of only five House Democrats in the 2022 midterm elections who won a district that Donald Trump carried in the 2020 presidential election; she outran Joe Biden's vote share by nearly 12%, the highest overperformance of any House Democrat in the midterms.

Candidates

Democratic Party

Advanced to general 
 Mary Peltola, incumbent U.S. Representative and former state representative

Withdrew 
 Christopher Constant, Anchorage Assembly member (endorsed Peltola)
 Mike Milligan, former Kodiak Island Borough Assembly member, Green nominee for this district in 1992 and for lieutenant governor in 1998 (endorsed Peltola)
 Adam Wool, state representative

Declined 
 Les Gara, former state representative (running for governor)
 Elvi Gray-Jackson, state senator
 Emil Notti, engineer, former commissioner of the Alaska Department of Commerce, Community and Economic Development, former chair of the Alaska Democratic Party, nominee for this district in 1973, and candidate for this district in the 2022 special election

Republican Party

Advanced to general 
 Nick Begich III, Alaska Policy Forum board member, grandson of former U.S. Representative Nick Begich, and nephew of former U.S. Senator Mark Begich and Alaska Senate Minority Leader Tom Begich
 Sarah Palin, former Governor of Alaska (2006–2009) and nominee for Vice President of the United States in 2008

Withdrew after advancing to general
 Tara Sweeney, former Assistant Secretary of the Interior for Indian Affairs

Eliminated in primary 
 Jay Armstrong
 Robert "Bob" Lyons, case manager
 Randy Purham, businessman and U.S. Army veteran
 Brad Snowden
 Denise Williams

Withdrawn 
 John Coghill, former majority leader of the Alaska Senate, former majority leader of the Alaska House of Representatives, son of former Lieutenant Governor Jack Coghill, and U.S. Air Force veteran (endorsed Begich)
 Mikel Melander
 Josh Revak, state senator and U.S. Army veteran
 Jesse Sumner, Matanuska-Susitna Borough Assembly member

Declined 
 Mead Treadwell, former Lieutenant Governor of Alaska (endorsed Palin and Sweeney)

Libertarian Party

Advanced to general 
 Chris Bye, fishing guide

Eliminated in primary 
 J. R. Myers, founder of the Alaska Constitution Party and its nominee for governor in 2014

Alaskan Independence Party

Declined 
 John Howe, machinist and nominee for U.S. Senate in 2020 (ran for governor)

American Independent Party

Eliminated in primary 
 Robert Ornelas, pastor and perennial candidate

Independents

Eliminated in primary 
 Gregg Brelsford, lawyer and former Bristol Bay Borough manager
 Lady Donna Dutchess, judicial reform activist
 Ted Heintz
 David Hughes
 David LeBlanc
 Sherry Mettler
 Silvio Pellegrini, businessman
 Andrew Phelps
 Sherry Strizak
 Tremayne Wilson

Withdrawn 
 Al Gross, orthopedic surgeon, commercial fisherman, son of former Alaska Attorney General Avrum Gross, and Democratic-endorsed nominee for U.S. Senate in 2020 (endorsed Peltola and Sweeney)
 William Hibler III, former glaciologist with the University of Alaska Fairbanks and Democratic candidate for this district in 2016 and 2020
 Jeff Lowenfels, attorney and gardening writer

Declined 
 Santa Claus, North Pole city councillor and candidate for this district in the 2022 special election (endorsed Peltola)
 Andrew Halcro, former Republican state representative, candidate for Governor of Alaska in 2006, and candidate for this district in the 2022 special election

Endorsements

Primary election

Results

General election

Predictions

Debates and forums
As of September 2022, there had been one debate featuring the general election candidates.

A little over an hour before election results came in for the final round of the 2022 Alaska's at-large congressional district special election, a debate was held for candidates of this house seat. All four candidates were included in the debate.

Polling

Results

See also 
2022 United States House of Representatives elections
2022 United States Senate election in Alaska
2022 Alaska gubernatorial election
2022 Alaska Senate election
2022 Alaska House of Representatives election

Notes

Partisan clients

References

External links
Official campaign websites
Nick Begich III (R) for Congress
Sarah Palin (R) for Congress
Mary Peltola (D) for Congress
Tara Sweeney (R) for Congress

2022
Alaska
United States House of Representatives
Sarah Palin